Three Songs is a set of songs for high voice and piano composed in 191819 by John Ireland (18791962). It consists of settings of three poems by Arthur Symons (18651945).

A typical performance of the songs as a set takes seven minutes. The poems are:
 "The Adoration" 
 "The Rat" 
 "Rest"

References 

Song cycles by John Ireland
Classical song cycles in English
1919 compositions
Musical settings of poems by Arthur Symons